This is a list of Bien de Interés Cultural landmarks in La Rioja, Spain.

Bridge of Mantible
Castle of Aguas Mansas
Castle of Arnedo
Castle of Cornago
Castle of Leiva
Castle of Quel
Cathedral of Santa María of Calahorra
Church of San Bartolomé (Logroño)
Church of San Martín (Entrena)
Church of Santa María (Fuenmayor)
Church of Santa María de Palacio (Logroño)
Church of Santo Tomás (Haro)
Co-cathedral of Santa María de la Redonda
Ruins of the Roman Bridge over the Leza River
Monastery of Nuestra Señora de Valvanera
Monastery of San Millán de Suso
Monastery of San Millán de Yuso
Monastery of Santa María (Cañas)
Monastery of Santa Maria de la Piedad (Casalarreina)
Santa María la Real of Nájera
Theatre of Bretón de los Herreros
Way of St. James

References 

La Rioja
 

es:Anexo:Bienes de Interés Cultural de La Rioja (España)